The Paris Courthouse Square Historic District, in Paris, Kentucky, is a  historic district which was listed on the National Register of Historic Places in 1979.  The listing included 21 contributing buildings.

It includes:
Bourbon County Courthouse (1902–05), designed by Frank P. Milburn, which is separately listed on the National Register
Duncan Tavern, which is separately listed on the National Register
The Memorial Building (1859), which served as a bank and residence until 1884, and later served World War I veterans and others
Teen Square (1960s), a one-story brick building
Ewalt Building (c.1840), a Greek Revival townhouse

It includes Italianate and other architecture.

The entire district was included in the 1989-listed Downtown Paris Historic District.

References

External links

Historic districts on the National Register of Historic Places in Kentucky
National Register of Historic Places in Bourbon County, Kentucky
Italianate architecture in Kentucky
Buildings and structures completed in 1788
Squares in the United States
1788 establishments in Virginia
Paris, Kentucky
Pre-statehood history of Kentucky